The Korail Class 200000 or TEC (Trunk line electric car) is an electric vehicle introduced in 2008. Two flights were converted into central inland circulation trains, and one was scrapped due to the Taebaek Line train crash, and one was operated as the train. Trains continue to operate.

History 
It was scheduled to deliver vehicles in the summer of 2008 and start operation on December 15 of the same year with the extension of metropolitan subway line 1. Due to the financial crisis, the amount of foreign currency delivery more than doubled from the time of contract. The first program was released on January 9, 2009, and the trial operation began on February 6. On June 1, 2009, operation began on Nuriro.

References 

Electric multiple units of South Korea
Hitachi multiple units
Train-related introductions in 2009
25 kV AC multiple units